Pasculli is a surname. Notable people with the surname include:

Antonio Pasculli (1842–1924), Italian oboist and composer
Pedro Pasculli (born 1960), Argentinian footballer